Poppy Lee Friar (born 16 April 1995) is an English actress. She has portrayed television roles including Eve in the CBBC series Eve, Missy Booth in the Channel 4 drama Ackley Bridge and Lydia in the BBC Three series In My Skin. As well as appearing in numerous television roles, she has also appeared in various films and theatre productions. For her work, Friar has received accolades including nominations at the AACTAs and the BAFTAs, as well as winning an RTS Award.

Career
Friar made her television debut in 2001 in Wilhelmina and was featured in several West End theatre productions between 2002 and 2007, including Macbeth at the Gielgud Theatre, Jane Banks in Mary Poppins at the Prince Edward Theatre and Louisa in The Sound of Music at the London Palladium. From 2005 to 2009, Friar voiced the role of June in the British version of the animated series Little Einsteins. In 2008, Friar played Hannah in the BBC television film Dustbin Baby, adapted from Jacqueline Wilson's 2001 novel of the same name. In 2010, she appeared in two ITV programmes; an episode of The Bill playing Kelli Sutton and two episodes of A Touch Of Frost as Sophie Moorhead. From 2013 to 2014, Friar appeared in the ITV drama Mr Selfridge as Rosalie Selfridge. Between 2015 and 2017, Friar played the titular role in the CBBC sci-fi series Eve. In 2017, Friar played Mary Pascoe in the film My Cousin Rachel.

In 2017, it was announced that Friar had been cast as series regular Missy Booth in the Channel 4 drama Ackley Bridge, for which she received critical acclaim and received an RTS award in her time on the series. In 2018, she portrayed Jayne Torvill in the ITV television film Torvill & Dean. Also in 2018, she starred in the BBC Three special In My Skin as Lydia. Later that year, it was announced that a full television series had been ordered, with Friar reprising her role as Lydia for two further series. In an episode broadcast on 25 June 2019, Friar's Ackley Bridge character Missy dies in previously unannounced scenes. This was written in response to Friar leaving the series to film In My Skin. After the conclusion of In My Skin, it was announced that she would be starring in BBC Three's 2022 television film Life and Death in the Warehouse. Friar is also set to star in the upcoming BBC television film My Name is Leon, as well as playing Mayella Ewell in a production of To Kill a Mockingbird, which will be on at the Gielgud Theatre in 2022.

Filmography

Stage

Awards and nominations

References

External links
 

1995 births
21st-century English actresses
Actresses from London
English child actresses
English film actresses
English soap opera actresses
English stage actresses
English television actresses
Living people
People from Southwark